John Russell, 6th Duke of Bedford,  (6 July 1766 – 20 October 1839), known as Lord John Russell until 1802, was a British Whig politician who notably served as Lord Lieutenant of Ireland in the Ministry of All the Talents. He was the father of Prime Minister John Russell, 1st Earl Russell.

Background
Bedford was a younger son of Francis Russell, Marquess of Tavistock, eldest son and heir of John Russell, 4th Duke of Bedford. His mother was Lady Elizabeth, the youngest child of Willem van Keppel, 2nd Earl of Albemarle and Lady Anne Lennox.

Political career
Like most Russells, Bedford was a Whig in politics. He sat as Member of Parliament for Tavistock from 1788 to June 1790 and from December 1790 to 1802, when he was automatically elevated to the Lords on the death of his brother. He served as Lord Lieutenant of Ireland during the Whig government of 1806–1807. He became, as did many of his party who were strong followers of Bonapartism, opposed to the Peninsular War, believing that it neither could nor should be won. He funded, along with his son, many anti-war publications. Bedford was sworn of the Privy Council in 1806 and appointed a Knight of the Garter in 1830.

Family
Bedford married firstly the Hon. Georgiana Byng, daughter of George Byng, 4th Viscount Torrington, in 1786. The marriage lasted 15 years and they had three sons:

Francis Russell, 7th Duke of Bedford
Lord George William Russell
Lord John Russell, Prime Minister of the United Kingdom and grandfather of philosopher Bertrand Russell.

After Georgiana's early death in October 1801, Bedford married secondly Lady Georgiana, daughter of Alexander Gordon, 4th Duke of Gordon, in 1803. They had ten children, including:

 Lady Georgiana Elizabeth Russell (d. 22 March 1867), married Charles Romilly and had issue
 Reverend Lord Wriothesley Russell (11 May 1804 – 6 April 1886), married Elizabeth Russell, his second cousin once removed, died without issue
 Admiral Lord Edward Russell (24 April 1805 – 21 May 1887), married Mary Ann Taylor and died without issue
 Lieutenant-Colonel Lord Charles James Fox Russell (10 February 1807 – 29 June 1894), married Isabella Davies and had issue
 Lady Louisa Jane Russell (8 July 1812 – 31 March 1905), married James Hamilton, 1st Duke of Abercorn and had issue.
 Lord Cosmo Russell (1817–1875)
 General Lord Alexander Russell (16 September 1821 – 10 January 1907), married Anne Holmes and had issue
 Lady Rachel Evelyn Russell (1826 – 21 February 1898), married Lord James Butler and had issue.

The Duchess of Bedford was a great patroness of the arts, and had a longstanding relationship with the painter Sir Edwin Landseer, a man twenty years her junior. The Bedfords' marriage was nevertheless considered to be a very happy one. Bedford was succeeded by his eldest son from his first marriage, Francis. The Duchess of Bedford died in February 1853, aged 71.

Bedford Lodge
In 1823 the 6th Duke of Bedford was looking for a house in London and took the lease of one of the seven houses designed and built by John Tasker on Campden Hill, Kensington, for the sum of £5,250. The lodge, previously occupied by General Sir John Fraser and then a Major Colegrave, was a simple Regency villa. The Duke employed his architect Jeffry Wyatt, who had worked for him on Woburn Abbey, to enlarge the villa. After these developments were completed, for several years Bedford Lodge was valued more highly for rating purposes than Holland House. After the Duke's death in 1839, the Dowager Duchess continued to live at Bedford Lodge and made it a famous centre for social gatherings. Duchess of Bedford's Walk in Kensington is named in her honour. Shortly after her death in 1853, it was taken by the eighth Duke of Argyll, who renamed the house Argyll Lodge and kept it until his death in 1900.

Footnotes and references
Notes

Citations

External links

Profile, thePeerage.com

|-

1766 births
1839 deaths
Lords Lieutenant of Ireland
406
Garter Knights appointed by William IV
Russell, John
Russell, John
Russell, John
Russell, John
Russell, John
Russell, John
Bedford, D6
John
Parents of prime ministers of the United Kingdom